Arthur H. Connolly Jr. (May 23, 1911 – August 24, 1996) served in the California State Assembly for the 21st district from 1947 to 1953. During World War II he served in the United States Navy.

References

United States Navy personnel of World War II
Republican Party members of the California State Assembly
1911 births
1996 deaths
20th-century American politicians